The Bonneville Joint School District #93 (D93) is a public school district in the U.S. state of Idaho, headquartered in an unincorporated area of Bonneville County (with an Idaho Falls postal address). District #93 serves more than 13,000 students in 20 schools, making it the fourth-largest by enrollment in the state. The district has: 15 elementary schools serving students in K-6, two middle schools serving students in grades 7–8, and  six high schools serving students in grades 9-12.

The district includes Ammon, Iona, Ucon, and portions of Idaho Falls, as well as the Lincoln census-designated place and other unincorporated areas of the county.

History
Chuck Shackett served as superintendent from 2001 to 2019, with Scott Woolstenhulme replacing him.

Schools

High schools
 Bonneville High School

 Hillcrest High School

 Thunder Ridge High School

Alternative high schools
 Lincoln Alternative High School

Middle schools
 Rocky Mountain Middle School
– Feeder Schools:
• Bridgewater Elementary School 
• Cloverdale Elementary School
• Discovery Elementary School 
• Fairview Elementary School 
• Falls Valley Elementary School 
• Iona Elementary School 
• Summit Hills Elementary School 
• Ucon Elementary School

 Sandcreek Middle School
– Feeder Schools:
• Ammon Elementary School 
• Falls Valley Elementary School 
• Hillview Elementary School 
• Mountain Valley Elementary School 
• Rimrock Elementary School 
• Tiebreaker Elementary School 
• Woodland Hills Elementary School

A third middle school, Black Canyon Middle School, opened in 2021.

Elementary schools
 Ammon Elementary School 
 Bridgewater Elementary School 
 Cloverdale Elementary School 
 Discovery Elementary School 
 Fairview Elementary School 
 Falls Valley Elementary School
 Hillview Elementary School 
 Iona Elementary School 
 Mountain Valley Elementary School 
 Rimrock Elementary School 
 Summit Hills Elementary School 
 Tiebreaker Elementary School 
 Ucon Elementary School  
 Woodland Hills Elementary School

References

School districts in Idaho
School districts established in 1950
1950 establishments in Idaho